John Bourke may refer to:

 John Bourke (Australian politician) (1901–1970), Australian politician
 John Bourke (footballer) (born 1953), Scottish footballer
 John Bourke, 1st Earl of Mayo (–1790), Irish politician and peer
 John Bourke, 2nd Earl of Mayo (–1792), Irish politician and peer
 John Bourke, 4th Earl of Mayo (1766–1849), Irish politician and peer
 John Gregory Bourke (1846–1896), American Civil War medal of honor recipient
 John Philip Bourke (1860–1914), Australian poet
 Sir John Bourke of Brittas, Irish Roman Catholic, hanged for refusing to renounce his faith

See also 
 John Burke (disambiguation)